The Masonic Building, (referred to by Montana State University as the Broadway III building) is a historic building in Billings, Montana, United States, that was built in 1910.  It was listed on the National Register of Historic Places in 1986 as Masonic Temple.

It was deemed "significant for its architecture as a good example of the second Renaissance Revival style, designed by the well known Montana architectural firm of Link and Haire. The Temple is also significant because it reflects the importance of the Masonic Order in the early community social life in Billings, Montana, and for its collective associations with many of the most notable men involved in the community's development at the turn of the century."

The building was sold in 2003 to Michael and Rebecca Gray and houses their advertising agency, G&G.

In 2013 it was an educational building of the Montana State University-Billings, Urban Institute. In October of 2016 it became a bookstore.

References

Clubhouses on the National Register of Historic Places in Montana
Masonic buildings completed in 1910
Buildings and structures in Billings, Montana
Former Masonic buildings in Montana
National Register of Historic Places in Yellowstone County, Montana
Renaissance Revival architecture in Montana